Albert Amos Tucker Jr. (February 24, 1943 – May 7, 2001) was an American professional basketball player.  Born in Dayton, Ohio, Tucker is sometimes credited with inventing the alley-oop with his brother Gerald while at Oklahoma Baptist University, Shawnee, Oklahoma.

College Records
With his brother Gerald, Al was recruited from Dayton to Oklahoma Baptist University, where he played 3 seasons.  Although he played before the introduction of the 3-point shot, he set a number of records, some of which remain 50 years later.  He had 27 rebounds in one game, 2,788 career points, 996 points in a season, 50 points in a game, a 31.1-point season scoring average, a 28.7-point career scoring average, 21 field goals in a game, 365 field goals in one season, 266 free throws in one season, 1,252 rebounds in a career, 467 rebounds in a season.

Professional career
A 6'8" forward, Tucker played four seasons (1967–1971) in the National Basketball Association and one season (1971–1972) in the American Basketball Association as a member of the Seattle SuperSonics, Cincinnati Royals, Chicago Bulls, Baltimore Bullets, and The Floridians. He averaged 10.1 points per game in his career and earned NBA All-Rookie Honors at the end of the 1967–68 NBA season.

Tucker is notable as the Seattle SuperSonics' first ever NBA draft pick, selected sixth overall in the 1967 NBA draft. Tucker was also selected in the 1967 ABA Draft by the Oakland Oaks.

Other
Tucker's father played for the Harlem Globetrotters in 1940.

See also
 1968 NAIA Division I men's basketball tournament
 1967 NAIA Division I men's basketball tournament
 NAIA Basketball Tournament Most Valuable Player
 Oklahoma Baptist University

References

External links
 Career statistics
 Obituary

1943 births
2001 deaths
American men's basketball players
Baltimore Bullets (1963–1973) players
Basketball players from Dayton, Ohio
Chicago Bulls players
Cincinnati Royals players
Miami Floridians players
Oakland Oaks draft picks
Oklahoma Baptist Bison basketball players
Seattle SuperSonics draft picks
Seattle SuperSonics players
Shooting guards
United States men's national basketball team players
1967 FIBA World Championship players